The  Vision Group of Companies, commonly known as the Vision Group, is a multimedia conglomerate in Uganda. It publishes the New Vision (newspaper), an English-language daily newspaper, that appears in print form and online, as well as newspapers and magazines in a variety of Ugandan languages.

History 

The group was established in 1986, with the flagship publication, the New Vision Newspaper. The company's first managing director was William Pike, who started the year the group launched.

In 2007, a board member of the New Vision Group was allegedly poisoned. In 2009, the group apologized for publishing a corruption story on Muwenda Mutebi II of Buganda.

The group launched its global mobile application (E-Paper) in 2015 but disabled it in 2019 to work on upgrading it. In March 2016, the groups signed a partnership with Wakaliwood Uganda to promote the Ugandan film industry. In 2017, the group's accountant was sentenced to five years in prison for embezzling 262 million shillings from the group from 2008 to 2013.

In May 2020, in the outburst of the COVID-19 pandemic in Uganda, the New Vision Group sent dozens of employees on forced leave without pay, twelve days after it had announced major salary cuts. Following this announcement, the group's accountant was found dead in her house.

Overview

The group's holding company is The New Vision Printing & Publishing Company Limited (also referred to as the Vision Group). The Group owns other newspapers, radio stations and two television stations, as of January 2010. The stock of the holding company is traded on the Uganda Securities Exchange, under the symbol NVL.

The address of the Group's headquarters is 19-21 First Street, in the industrial area of Kampala.

Subsidiary companies
The subsidiary companies of  the Vision Group include:
 New Vision (newspaper): published in English
 Bukedde newspaper: published in Luganda
 Orumuri newspaper: published in Runyankore/Rukiga (or Runyakitara)
 Etop newspaper: published in Ateso
 Rupiny newspaper: published in Luo
 Premiership magazine: Soccer magazine covering English, African and Ugandan soccer news, published monthly in English.
 City Beat magazine: Entertainment magazine aimed at the affluent 19 to 35 demographic age group, published monthly in English
 Secondary Schools Directory: published annually in English
 Bride & Groom magazine: Bridal magazine, published quarterly in English
 New Vision Printing & Publishing Company Limited: Most newspapers in Uganda, Rwanda and Southern Sudan are printed by Vision Printing.
 Vision Voice FM 94.8, (now X-FM): Based in Kampala.
 Radio Bukedde FM 100.5: Based in Kampala. Broadcasts in Luganda
100.2 Fm Radio West : Based in Mbarara. The dominant radio station in the Western Region of Uganda. Broadcasts in Runyankole/Rukiga, Runyoro/Rutoro and English.
 Radio Rupiny FM 95.7: Based in Gulu. Broadcasts in Luo
 Radio Etop FM 99.4: Based in Soroti. Broadcasts in Ateso
 Arua One FM 88.7: Acquired in Arua during 2012. Broadcasts in Lugbara, Swahili and English.
 Urban Television: Launched in October 2009. Transmits in English
 Bukedde Television (BTV): Launched in October 2009. Transmits in Luganda
 West Television (West TV): Operating in the Western parts of Uganda alongside Radio West. transmits in Runyankole/Rukiga, Runyoro/Rutoro and English.

Ownership
The Vision Group is owned by the Ugandan government and by  institutional and individual investors. The shares of the Group are traded on the Uganda Securities Exchange (USE), under he symbol:NVL. The table below summarizes the ownership structure of the Vision Group, as of 30 June 2016.

See also
 Nation Media Group
 New Vision Newspaper
 Uganda Securities Exchange

References

External links 
Official website

 
Mass media companies of Uganda
Conglomerate companies of Uganda
Companies listed on the Uganda Securities Exchange
Companies established in 1986
1986 establishments in Uganda
Mass media in Kampala
Companies based in Kampala